Mickaël Barzalona (born 3 August 1991 in Avignon, France) is a French-born Thoroughbred horse racing jockey, who is the retained jockey in France for Godolphin.

Career
Barzalona was born into a racing family, his grandfather is Christian Barzalona a trainer based in Corsica and his uncle Armand Barzalona a former flat and jumps jockey. Barzalona began his career with André Fabre as an apprentice in 2009 and rode out his claim within the year with 72 wins. His first victory for the Godolphin team came at the Dubai Gold Cup in Meydan, before winning his first Group 1 with Wavering in the Prix Saint-Alary at ParisLongchamp.

In June 2011, Barzalona rode Pour Moi to win the 2011 Epsom Derby at Epsom, performing a remarkable in-race move from last place to 1st over the final straight, winning by a head. As he approached the finish line, Barzalona stood up in the stirrups and celebrated. This caused much comment and photos in the media following the race. Less than 2 weeks later, Barzalona rode a good race to take 16-1 underdog, Opinion Poll to 2nd place in the Gold Cup at Ascot behind odds-on favourite and defending champion, Fame and Glory. Barzalona also won the 2011 running of the Premio Roma in Italy on Zazou. 

In March 2012, Barzalona was announced as a Godolphin jockey alongside Silvestre de Sousa. Later that month he comfortably won the $10 million Dubai World Cup, riding 20-1 outsider Monterosso from the Godolphin stable.  It was Godolphin's first Dubai World Cup win since 2006. He won his second English classic aboard Encke in the 2012 St Leger.

In 2014, Barzalona returned to France and became Godolphin's lead jockey in the country. This came after he was demoted from the main jockey with trainer Charlie Appleby for Godolphin.  He has since added a number of Group 1 wins there, riding horses such as Victor Ludorum, Castle Lady, Ultra and Kitesurf. In 2021 Barzalona was crowned Champion Jockey in France with 192 wins.

Outside France, Barzalona has achieved successes at Group 1 level. He won the 2017 Breeders' Cup Turf with Talismanic, and has four victories in the Al Maktoum Challenge, Round 3 at Meydan. He returned to the Great Britain to take victory in the 2019 Middle Park Stakes with Earthlight.

Major wins 
 France
 Poule d'Essai des Poulains - (1) - Victor Ludorum (2020)
 Poule d'Essai des Pouliches - (1) - Castle Lady (2019)
 Prix de l'Opéra - (1) - Place Du Carrousel (2022)
 Prix Ganay - (1) - Cloth of Stars (2017)
 Prix Jean-Luc Lagardère - (4) - Ultra (2015), Victor Ludorum (2019), Sealiway (2020), Belbek (2022) 
 Prix Jean Prat - (2) - Havana Gold (2013), Territories (2015)
 Prix Saint-Alary - (1) - Wavering (2011)
 Prix Vermeille - (1) - Kitesurf (2018)
 Prix Morny - (1) - Earthlight (2019)
 Prix Maurice de Gheest - (1) - Marianafoot (2021)

 Great Britain
 Champion Stakes - (1) - Sealiway (2021)
 Epsom Derby - (1) - Pour Moi (2011)
 Fillies' Mile - (1) - Certify (2012)
 St. Leger - (1) - Encke (2012)
 Middle Park Stakes - (1) - Earthlight (2019)

 Italy
 Premio Roma - (1) - Zazou (2011)

 United Arab Emirates
 Dubai World Cup - (1) - Monterosso (2012)
 Al Maktoum Challenge, Round 3 - (4) - Long River (2017), Capezzano (2019), Matterhorn (2020), Hypothetical (2022) 

 United States
 Breeders' Cup Turf - (1) - Talismanic  (2017)

References

External links
Racing Post Profile

1991 births
Living people
French jockeys